Lovers and Liars (Viaggio con Anita) is a 1979 Italian comedy film directed by Mario Monicelli and starring Goldie Hawn and Giancarlo Giannini. It is Hawn's only foreign film.  It was released in the United States in February 1981.

Plot
Anita (Hawn) is an American actress who decides to vacation in Rome. There, she becomes involved in a romance with her friend's married lover Guido (Giannini).

Cast
Goldie Hawn as Anita
Giancarlo Giannini as Guido Massacesi
Claudine Auger as Elisa Massacesi
Aurore Clément as Cora
Laura Betti as Laura
Andréa Ferréol as Noemi
 Renzo Montagnani as Teo 
 Franca Tamantini as Oriana Massacesi
 Gino Santercole as Tonino, the truck driver
 Lorraine de Selle as Gennifer

References

External links 
 
 

1979 films
1970s Italian-language films
Fictional couples
Films scored by Ennio Morricone
Films directed by Mario Monicelli
1970s comedy road movies
Films produced by Alberto Grimaldi
Italian comedy road movies
1979 comedy films
1970s Italian films